Constantine II, also Kostandin II, (unknown – after February 17, 1129) was the fourth lord of Armenian Cilicia or “Lord of the Mountains” (1129/1130).

The Chronique Rimée de la Petite Arménie (“The Rhymed Chronicle of Armenia Minor”) of Vahram of Edessa records that he was the son of Thoros I, lord of Armenian Cilicia. His mother's name is not known.

He died a few months after his father's death in the course of a palace intrigue. Vahram of Edessa, the historian tells us that he was cast into prison and poisoned to death.

Other historians (e.g., Jacob G. Ghazarian, Vahan M. Kurkjian) suggest that Thoros I died without a male heir and was succeeded by Leon I.

Footnotes

Sources 
Ghazarian, Jacob G: The Armenian Kingdom in Cilicia during the Crusades: The Integration of Cilician Armenians with the Latins (1080–1393); RoutledgeCurzon (Taylor & Francis Group), 2000, Abingdon;

External links
The Barony of Cilician Armenia (Kurkjian's History of Armenia, Ch. 27)

1129 deaths
12th-century murdered monarchs
Deaths by poisoning
Year of birth unknown
12th-century Armenian people
Monarchs of the Rubenid dynasty